The 1962–63 Scottish Inter-District Championship was a rugby union competition for Scotland's district teams.

This season saw the tenth formal Scottish Inter-District Championship.

Edinburgh District won the competition with 3 wins.

1962-63 League Table

Results

Round 1

South: J.H. Gray (Hawick), Christy Elliot (Langholm), A. W. Ford (Kelso), George Stevenson (Hawick) [captain], W. Hollands (Gala), A. R. Broatch (Hawick), R. G. Turnbull (Hawick), Norm Suddon (Hawick), Frank Laidlaw (Melrose), G. H. Willison (Hawick), Jim Telfer (Melrose), Billy Hunter (Hawick), Rob Valentine (Hawick), Oliver Grant (Hawick), Charlie Stewart (Kelso)

Glasgow District: A. T. Henderson (Hutchesons' GSFP), G. R. Greig (Glasgow HSFP), D. A. C. Montgomery (Glasgow Academicals), G. M. Simmers (Glasgow Academicals) [captain], P. M. Connelly (Jordanhill), Brian Simmers (Glasgow Academicals), A. E. C. Little (Glasgow HSFP), I. G. C. McLaren (Glasgow HSFP), I. G. Thomson (West of Scotland), T. E. R. Young (West of Scotland), A. J. McKellar (West of Scotland), Hamish Kemp (Glasgow HSFP), A. D. Innes (Glasgow Academicals), Peter Brown (West of Scotland), J. Buchanan (Jordanhill)

Round 2

North and Midlands: C. C. McLeod (Madras College F.P), A. N. Cook (Gordonians), L. R. Macdonald (Aberdeen GSFP), B. W. Brown (St. Andrews University), A. Bryce (Dunfermline), J. R. Clarke (Perthshire Academicals), Ian McCrae (Gordonians), David Rollo (Howe of Fife), A. G. D. Whyte (Gordonians), I. C. Spence (Gordonians), J. Beveridge (Dunfermline), E. Brocklebank (Madras College F.P.), J. B. Steven (Madras College F.P.) [captain], J. N. Smith (Perthshire Academicals), C. E. S. Burnett (Panmure)

South: J.H. Gray (Hawick), Christy Elliot (Langholm), George Stevenson (Hawick) [captain], A. R. Broatch (Hawick), W. Hollands (Gala), David Chisholm (Melrose), Alex Hastie (Melrose), Norm Suddon (Hawick), Frank Laidlaw (Melrose), G. H. Willison (Hawick), Billy Hunter (Hawick), Jim Telfer (Melrose),  Rob Valentine (Hawick), Oliver Grant (Hawick), D. M. Brown (Melrose)

Round 3

 North and Midlands: B. W. A. Mitchell (Perthshire Academicals), A. N. Cook (Gordonians), C. C. McLeod (Madras College F. P.), B. W. Brown (St. Andrews University), A. Byrce (Dunfermline), J. R. Clarke (Perthshire Academicals), Ian McCrae (Gordonians), G. P. Hill (Gordonians), A. G. D. Whyte (Gordonians), I. C. Spence (Gordonians), J. Beveridge (Dunfermline), A. R. Porteous (Perthshire Academicals), J. B. Steven (Madras College F. P.) [captain], D. G. M. Mowat (Perthshire Academicals), R. J. C. Glasgow (Dunfermline)

Edinburgh District: Colin Blaikie (Heriots F.P), A. J. W. Hinshelwood (Stewart's College F. P.), B. C. Henderson (Edinburgh Wanderers), P. J. Burnet (Edinburgh Academicals), W. S. Robertson (Edinburgh Wanderers), J. Black (Royal HSFP), G. F. Goddard (Heriots F.P.), J. Steven (Edinburgh Wanderers), G. I. Grahamsaw (Royal HSFP), J. B. Neill (Edinburgh Academicals), J. Douglas (Stewart's College F. P.), J. K. Millar (Edinburgh Academicals), I. P. Fisher (Royal HSFP), A. C. McNish (Watsonians), K. I. Ross (Boroughmuir F. P.)

Round 4

Glasgow District: A. T. Henderson (Hutchesons' GSFP), G. R. Greig (Glasgow HSFP), D. A. C. Montgomery (Glasgow Academicals), G. M. Simmers (Glasgow Academicals) [captain], I. F. Docherty (Glasgow HSFP), Brian Simmers (Glasgow Academicals), A. E. C. Little (Glasgow HSFP), I. G. C. McLaren (Glasgow HSFP), I. G. Thomson (West of Scotland), T. E. R. Young (West of Scotland), A. J. McKellar (West of Scotland), J. S. Couper (Glasgow HSFP), W. Davies (Glasgow University), A. D. Innes (Glasgow Academicals), J. Buchanan (Jordanhill)

Edinburgh District: Colin Blaikie (Heriots F.P), J. D. Jardine (Edinburgh Academicals), B. C. Henderson (Edinburgh Wanderers), P. J. Burnet (Edinburgh Academicals), W. S. Robertson (Edinburgh Wanderers), J. Blake (Royal HSFP), S. Coughtrie (Edinburgh Academicals) [captain], John Steven (Edinburgh Wanderers), J. R. Taylor (Trinity Academicals), J. B. Neill (Edinburgh Academicals), J. L. Gormley (Boroughmuir F.P.), J. K. Millar (Edinburgh Academicals), J. P. Fisher (Royal HSFP), A. C. McNish (Watsonians), K. I. Ross (Boroughmuir F. P.)

Round 5

Edinburgh District: Colin Blaikie (Heriots F.P), J. D. Jardine (Edinburgh Academicals), D. L. Lees (Edinburgh Wanderers), B. C. Henderson (Edinburgh Wanderers), W. S. Robertson (Edinburgh Wanderers), J. Blake (Royal HSFP), S. Coughtrie (Edinburgh Academicals) [captain], John Steven (Edinburgh Wanderers), G. I. Grahamslaw (Royal HSFP), J. B. Neill (Edinburgh Academicals), J. K. Millar (Edinburgh Academicals), John Douglas (Stewart's College F.P), J. P. Fisher (Royal HSFP), A. C. McNish (Watsonians), K. I. Ross (Boroughmuir F. P.)

South: J.H. Gray (Hawick), Christy Elliot (Langholm), George Stevenson (Hawick) [captain], A. R. Broatch (Hawick), D. Jackson (Hawick), David Chisholm (Melrose), Alex Hastie (Melrose), Norm Suddon (Hawick), Frank Laidlaw (Melrose), G. H. Willison (Hawick),  Jim Telfer (Melrose), Billy Hunter (Hawick), Rob Valentine (Hawick), Oliver Grant (Hawick), D. M. Brown (Melrose)

Round 6

Glasgow District: A. T. Henderson (Hutchesons' GSFP), D. A. C. Montgomery (Glasgow Academicals), G. R. Greig (Glasgow HSFP), G. M. Simmers (Glasgow Academicals) [captain], P. M. Connelly (Jordanhill), Brian Simmers (Glasgow Academicals), I. D. Beattie (Jordanhill), I. G. C. McLaren (Glasgow HSFP), I. G. Thomson (West of Scotland), T. E. R. Young (West of Scotland), Hamish Kemp (Glasgow HSFP), A. J. McKellar (West of Scotland),  W. Davies (Glasgow University), J. Buchanan (Jordanhill), R. G. McCallum (Greenock Wanderers)

North and Midlands: C. C. McLeod (Madras College F.P) [captain], A. N. Cook (Gordonians), B. W. Brown (St. Andrews University), A. Wilson (Aberdeeen University), A. Bryce (Dunfermline), F. N. McKenzie (Aberdeen GSFP), I. G. McCrae (Gordonians), G. P. Mill (Gordonians), A. G. D. Whyte (Gordonians), David Rollo (Howe of Fife), J. Beveridge (Dunfermline), A. R. Porteous (Perthshire Academicals), M. G. Walker (Aberdeeen GSFP), D. G. Mowat (Perthshire Academicals), D. A. G. Smith (Perthshire Academicals)

Matches outwith the Championship

Other Scottish matches

Aberdeen University: 

North of Scotland District Select: K. Mulholland (Gordonlans), A. N. Cook (Gordonlans), I. R. Macdonald (Aberdeen GSFP), C. Tennant (Gordonians) S. Keir (Gordonlans), D. Halkerston (Aberdeen Academicals), Ian McCrae (Gordonians), G. P. Hill (Gordonians), A. G. D. Whyte (Gordonians), I. C. Spence (Gordonians) [captain], M. G. H. Gibb (Aberdeen GSFP), R. Taylor (Dounreay), R. Davidson (Aberdeen Academicals), D. W. T. Paul (Aberdeen GSFP), M. G. J. Clark (Gordoninans)

Glasgow District: 

Rest of the West: 

North of Scotland District: K. Mulholland (Gordonlans), N. Cook (Gordonlans), I. R. Macdonald (Aberdeen GSFP), A. Wilson (Aberdeen University). S. Keir (Gordonlans), D. Halkerston (Aberdeen Academicals), Ian McCrae (Gordonians), G. P. Hill (Gordonians), A. G. D. Whyte (Gordonians), I. C. Spence (Gordonians), D. M. Henderson (Aberdeen University), G. W. Fraser (Aberdeen GSFP), W. Balfour (Aberdeen GSFP), D. W. T. Paul (Aberdeen GSFP), I. E. Allan (Gordoninans)

Midlands District: C. C. McLeod (Madras College F.P.), A. W. Sinclair (St. Andrews University), D. J. Whyte (St. Andrews University), B. W. Brown (St. Andrews University), A. Bryce (Dunfermline), J. R. Clarke (Perthshire Academicals), E. Duncan (Madras College F.P.), A Pattullo (Panmure), A. J. Nicol (Howe of Fife), D. M. Brien (Perthshire Academicals), J. W. Smith (Perthshire Academicals), J. Beveridge (Dunfermline), J. B. Steven (Madras College F.P.), D. G. M. Mowat (Perthshire Academicals), C. E. Burnett (Panmure)

Trial matches

Blues Trial: K. J. F. Scotland (Leicester), R. H. Thomson (London Scottish), J. J. McPartlin (Oxford University), I. H. P. Laughland (London Scottish), W. S. Robinson (Edinburgh Wanderers), David Chisholm (Melrose), J. A. T. Rodd (London Scottish), David Rollo (Howe of Fife), A. G. D. Whyte (Gordonians),  J. B. Neill (Edinburgh Academicals), F. H. ten Bos (London Scottish), Mike Campbell-Lamerton (Halifax), R. J. C. Glasgow (Dunfermline), T. O. Grant (Hawick), R. I. Marshall (London Scottish)

Whites Trial: S. Wilson (St. Peter's Hall, Oxford University), D. M. White (St. John's College, Oxford University), R. E. Leslie (Northampton), G. D. Stevenson (Hawick), C. G. Hodgson (London Scottish), J. Blake (Royal HSFP), S. Coughtrie (Edinburgh Academicals) [captain], A. C. W. Boyle (London Scottish), F. A. L. Laidlaw (Melrose), I. C. Spence (Gordonians), Billy Hunter (Hawick), P. K. Stagg (Oxford University), K. I. Ross (Boroughmuir), J. W. Telfer (Melrose), R. A. W. Watherson (London Scottish)

Blues Trial: K. J. F. Scotland (Heriots) [captain], J. A. P. Shackleton (London Scottish), B. C. Henderson (Edinburgh Wanderers), D. M. White (Kelvinside Academicals), G. D. Stevenson (Hawick), J. Blake (Royal HSFP), S. Coughtrie (Edinburgh Academicals), A. C. W. Boyle (London Scottish), N. S. Bruce (London Scottish), David Rollo (Howe of Fife), W. J. Hunter (Hawick), Mike Campbell-Lamerton (Halifax), R. J. C. Glasgow (Dunfermline), W. R. A. Watherston (London Scottish), J. P. Fisher (Royal HSFP)

Whites Trial: Colin Blaikie (Heriots), C. Elliot (Langholm), G. R. Greig (Glasgow HSFP), A. R. Broatch (Hawick), D. J. Whyte (St. Andrews University), R. H. Lamb (Oxford University), Alex Hastie (Melrose), Norm Suddon (Hawick), F. A. L. Laidlaw (Melrose), J. B. Neill (Edinburgh Academicals) [captain], F. H. ten Bos (London Scottish), J. K. Millar (Edinburgh Academicals), J. C. Brash (Middlesbrough), John Douglas (Stewart's College F.P.), K. I. Ross (Boroughmuir) - J. D. Jardine (Edinburgh Academicals) replaced D. J. Whyte after 17 minutes.

Blues Trial: T. L. B. Adam (Edinburgh University), C. Elliot (Langholm), K. A. I. Davidson (Watsonians), ? (Stewart's College F.P.), G. D. Stevenson (Hawick), A. R. Broatch (Hawick), R. G. Turnbull (Hawick), I. C. Spence (Gordonians), ? (Stewart's College F.P), Norm Suddon (Hawick), J. K. Millar (Edinburgh Academicals) Jim Telfer (Melrose), K. I. Ross (Hawick), T. O. Grant (Hawick), J. P. Fisher (Royal HSFP) [captain]

Whites Trial: J. H. Gray (Hawick), J. D. Jardine (Edinburgh Academicals), R. W. Cameron (Royal HSFP), David Chisholm (Melrose), D. Jackson (Hawick), K. J. F. Scotland (Heriots) [captain], S. Coughtrie (Edinburgh Academicals), W. A. M. Crow (Edinburgh Wanderers), Frank Laidlaw (Melrose), J. B. Neill (Edinburgh Academicals), Billy Hunter (Hawick), G. W. S. Mitchell (Edinburgh University), A. Jeffrey (Langholm), John Douglas (Stewart's College F.P), ? (Kelso)

English matches

Durham County: H. Knox, M. G. Adamson, J. A. W. Baker, M. Harvey, J. M. Ranson, A. E. Chapman, A. C. W. A. Eccles, J. E. Close [captain], H. Lamb, D. Jesson, S. Hutton, I. Brown, M. G. Forster, G. C. D. Zissler, P. Ashworth

Scottish Border XV:  J.H. Gray (Hawick), Christy Elliot (Langholm), G. D. Stevenson (Hawick) [captain], David Chisholm (Melrose), A. T. Grieve (Langholm), A. R. Broatch (Hawick), R. G. Turnbull (Hawick), A. A. Carson (Gala), Frank Laidlaw (Melrose), Norm Suddon (Hawick), Billy Hunter (Hawick), Jim Telfer (Melrose), Rob Valentine (Hawick), D. M. Brown (Melrose), C. E. B. Stewart (Kelso)

Scottish Border XV: J. H. Gray (Hawick), C. Elliot (Langholm), G. D. Stevenson (Hawick) [captain], David Chisholm (Melrose), W. Hollands (Gala), A. R. Broatch (Hawick), R. G. Turnbull (Hawick), Norm Suddon (Hawick), F. Laidlaw (Melrose), G. H. Willison (Hawick), Billy Hunter (Hawick), C. E. B. Stewart (Kelso), T. O. Grant (Hawick), R. Valentine (Hawick)

RAF: G. Hopkins (Leicester), G. Harries (Bedford), M. Greenhow (Wasps), J. J. Keepe (London Irish), I. Parsons (Saracens), S. Thomas (Bath), M. J. Dymond (Leicester), T. Wilson (Gloucester), J. Berry (Penzance), A. P. Close (Swansea), R. Glazscher (Plymouth), K. J. Mulligan (London Irish), B. E. Morgan (Oxford), K. G. Lappin (Leicester), J. V. McCarthy (London Irish)

International matches

Glasgow District: A. T. Henderson (Hutchesons' GSFP), G. R. Grieg (Glasgow HSFP), D. A. C. Montgomery (Glasgow Academicals), G. M. Simmers (Glasgow Academicals) [captain], I. F. Docherty (Glasgow HSFP), B. M. Simmers (Glasgow Academicals), A. E. C. Little (Glasgow HSFP), I. G. C. McLaren (Glasgow HSFP), I. G. Thomson (West of Scotland), T. E. R. Young (West of Scotland), A. J. McKellar (West of Scotland), Hamish Kemp (Glasgow HSFP), W. Davies (Glasgow University), A. D. Innes (Glasgow Academicals), J. Buchanan (Jordanhill)

Canada: D. Burgess, G. Full, R. M. Clark, R. McKee, J. Newton, J. D. B. Stubbs, P. J. P. Moroney, D. L. Moore, G. L. C. Paterson, P. R. Grantham, J. Lecky, D. M. Frid, W. G. Biarneson, R. S. Wilson, M. P. Chambers

Edinburgh District: Colin Blaikie (Heriots F.P), J. D. Jardine (Edinburgh Academicals), B. C. Henderson (Edinburgh Wanderers), P. J. Burnet (Edinburgh Academicals), W. S. Robertson (Edinburgh Wanderers), J. Blake (Royal HSFP), G. F. Goddard (Heriots F.P.), John Steven (Edinburgh Wanderers), G. I. Grahamslaw (Royal HSFP), J. B. Neill (Edinburgh Academicals), John Douglas (Stewart's College F.P.), J. K. Millar (Edinburgh Academicals), J. P. Fisher (Royal HSFP), A. C. McNish (Watsonians), K. I. Ross (Boroughmuir F. P.)

Canada: D. Burgess, G. Full, R. M. Clark, R. McKee, J. Newton, J. D. B. Stubbs, P. J. P. Moroney, D. L. Moore, G. L. C. Paterson, P. R. Grantham, J. Lecky, D. M. Frid, W. G. Biarneson, R. S. Wilson, M. P. Chambers   

Provinces District: J.H. Gray (Hawick), A. T. Grieve (Langholm), A. R. Broatch (Hawick), G. D. Stevenson (Hawick), Christy Elliot (Langholm), David Chisholm (Melrose) [captain], Alex Hastie (Melrose), G. P. Hill (Gordonians), A. G. D. Whyte (Gordonians), I. C. Spence (Gordonians), Billy Hunter (Hawick), Jim Telfer (Melrose), Rob Valentine (Hawick), T. O. Grant (Hawick), R. J. C. Glasgow (Dunfermline)

Canada: I. B. Burnham, W. G. Stover, R. M. Clark, G. Wessels, J. Newton, J. D. B. Stubbs, J. M. Ward, D. L. Moore [captain], P. Frize, P. R. Grantham, D. N. Ure, W. Granleese, B. N. Williams, R. S. Wilson, M. P. Chambers

References

1962–63 in Scottish rugby union
Scottish Inter-District Championship seasons